Lower the Bar is the fourth studio album by American glam metal band Steel Panther. It was originally scheduled for release on February 24, 2017, but was delayed to the following month.

Robin Zander and Bobbie Brown made cameo appearances in the music video for Cheap Trick's cover "She's Tight".

Track listing

Personnel 
Michael Starr – lead vocals, backing vocals
Satchel – guitars, acoustic guitar, backing vocals
Lexxi Foxx – bass, backing vocals
Stix Zadinia – drums, piano, backing vocals

Additional musicians 
Chris Catton – backing vocals (track 9)
Michael Catton – backing vocals (track 9)
Rudy Sarzo – bass (track 5)
Michael Lord – piano (track 13)

Charts

References

External links 
 She's Tight on Vevo
 Poontang Boomerang on Vevo

2017 albums
Steel Panther albums